Liaromorpha is an Asian genus of bush crickets in the tribe Agraeciini, belonging to the 'conehead' subfamily Conocephalinae.  Species records are mostly from Indo-China.

Species
The Orthoptera Species File lists:
Liaromorpha aspinosa Ingrisch, 1998
Liaromorpha buonluoiensis Gorochov, 1994 - type species
Liaromorpha natalicium Gorochov, 2007
Liaromorpha nitida Ingrisch, 1998

References

External links 
 
 Images of L. nitida on Orthoptera Species File

Conocephalinae
Tettigoniidae genera
Orthoptera of Indo-China